Karl Ludwig Libay (Slovakian: Karol Ľudovít Libai; 13 May 1814/16, Banská Bystrica – 16 January 1888, Vienna) was a Slovak lithographer, draftsman and painter.

Biography
His father, was a silversmith and goldsmith. He began with the intention of becoming a goldsmith as well; serving an apprenticeship with his father from 1892 to 1832. That year, the Goldsmith's Guild promoted him to Journeyman. Two years later, aged only twenty, he achieved the status of Master. Shortly after, he went to Vienna to sharpen his skills, but his exposure to the cosmopolitanism there diverted his attention to a different kind of artistic endeavor.

In 1835, he enrolled at the Academy of Fine Arts. His teachers there included the portraitist, Johann Nepomuk Ender, Leopold Kupelwieser (a friend of Franz Schubert), and the landscape painter, Joseph Mössmer. His first paintings were mostly landscapes and vedute. After 1845, he was able to continue his studies with the assistance of a patron; Count .

He loved to travel and created several lithographic albums of his travels throughout Europe. His first exhibition came in 1840, with views of Budapest. In 1848, he published a book with views of Bad Ischl and, the following year, one of Salzburg with scenes of the Salzkammergut region. From 1849 to 1850, he travelled from Bavaria to Southern Italy; painting views for Archduke John of Austria. A trip to Egypt from 1855 to 1856 resulted in an album of 45 color lithographs, for which he received an award from Alexander von Humboldt in 1857. A planned trip to the Americas was never realized, due to Von Humboldt's death.

His first lithographs of his hometown appeared in 1852, when he made a lengthy return visit. Five years later, he returned again and focused on drawing castles; notably at Orava and Zvolen. During his visit in 1883, he also made sketches in Sklené Teplice and Štrbské Pleso. His last visits came in 1884 and 1886, when he made sketches on Mount Urpín. His last drawings were made in Salzburg, in 1887.

On Christmas Eve, he always gave clothing and shoes to poor children. He left a ten-page will, which included a large donation to the Evangelical Elementary School in Banská Bystrica. Single and childless, he was given a modest funeral and, per his wishes, his heart was pierced.

References

Further reading 
 Storchová, Lucie and Magdolen, Dusan, Egypt: Travel Sketches from the Orient (Karl Ludwig Libay),  Czech Institute of Egyptology, 2006 
 Zmetáková, Danica: Karol Ľudovít Libay (1814 – 1888). Cesty a návraty na Slovensko. Slovenská národná galéria, Bratislava 1997, .
 Žilák, Ján: "Genealógia zlatníckeho rodu Libayovcov z Banskej Bystrice". In: Banská Bystrica. Historicko-etnologické štúdie 1. Bitušíková, Alexandra. Banská Bystrica, Inštitút sociálnych a kultúrnych štúdií – Fakulta humanitných vied Univerzity Mateja Bela v Banskej Bystrici 2000  pgs.74–94.
 Žilák, Ján: "Genealógia zlatníckeho a strieborníckeho rodu Libayovcov". In: Medzinárodný seminár – Európske ložiská striebra a vplyvy ich ťažby na životné prostredie, SBM Banská Štiavnica 2002  pgs.113–124.

External links 

 Biography @ the Salzburg Wiki

1810s births
1888 deaths
Slovak painters
Landscape painters
Cityscape artists
Lithographers
Slovak illustrators
Academy of Fine Arts Vienna alumni
People from Banská Bystrica